Sharnol Leonard Adriana (born November 13, 1970) is a Curaçaoan-Dutch baseball player and coach. He spent several minor league seasons in the Toronto Blue Jays organization before moving to the Mexican League. As of 2020, he is a coach for the Spokane Indians.

Early years
Born in Willemstad, Adriana began his professional baseball career after being taken in the 15th round of the 1991 MLB Draft by the Toronto Blue Jays. The Blue Jays assigned him to their St. Catharines Blue Jays farm team, where he hit .206-.311-.341 as the regular shortstop. In 1992, he was the second baseman for the Dunedin Blue Jays and he hit .276-.369-.333. In 1993, the 22-year-old was struggling with the AA Knoxville Smokies, where his line read .215-.308-.243 as the backup to Joe Lis Jr.

Mexican Baseball
Sharnol moved to the Liga Mexicana de Beisbol in 2000, returning to Newark for a brief .118 spell. Splitting the year between the Cafeteros de Córdoba and the Campeche Pirates, he had a .326/~.441/.603 line, stole 24 in 36 tries, homered 29 times and led the Liga with 113 runs scored. He also spent time representing the Netherlands in the 2000 Olympics. In 2001, he had another 20-20 year (21 SB, 28 HR, five shy of league leader Boi Rodriguez), batting .313 and slugging .581 for Campeche while scoring 89 runs. He also batted .254 with four homers for Newark. In the 2001 Baseball World Cup, Adriana hit .188/.289/.250 as the Dutch team DH.

In 2002, he reversed course during year, returning to Cordoba from Campeche and hitting .317 and slugging .520. During the 2002 Intercontinental Cup, Adriana hit .350/.435/.350. He batted .301/?/.488 for Cordoba in the '03 season. He had the best average in the 2003 European Baseball Championship, hitting .500/~.613/.583 for the champion Dutch squad. He scored 9 runs in 8 games and his 7 walks were two behind leader Claudio Liverziani. Adriana hit .391/.407/1.043 in the 2003 Baseball World Cup with 10 RBI, 6 runs, 3 doubles and four homers in six games. He became the third player in Cup history to hit three homers in a game, following Antonio Muñoz (1980 and Luis Casanova (1990). Adriana had his three-homer game against France. He was named the Cup All-Star first baseman (beating out Yasuyuki Saigo, Olmedo Saenz, Tae-kyun Kim and Kendry Morales) and tied for third in homers, one behind Takashi Yoshiura and Audes de Leon.
He continued to pummel the ball in 2004, hitting .297/~.422/.480 with 7 HR for the Yucatan Lions and Monclova Steelers. He again appeared for the Dutch Olympic squad that year.

Adriana bounced back in 2005, as the 34-year-old veteran hit .368/.452/.634 for the San Luis Potosi Tuneros, leading the Liga in runs (105) and total bases (277), stealing 32 (caught 21 times though, the most) and smacking 25 homers. In the 2005 Baseball World Cup, he hit .273/.314/.576 with 13 RBI in 10 games.

National Baseball Team
Playing for the Netherlands in the 2006 World Baseball Classic, Adriana went 2 for 6 with a double. In the 2006 Intercontinental Cup, he hit .405-.511-.568 with 11 RBI in nine games. He was second to Yoandry Urgellés in RBI and made the all-tournament team at first bat. In the 2008 Summer Olympics, as the captain of the Dutch squad, the first baseman hit .217-.250-.391 with only two runs and one RBI in 7 games; he still wound up with the third-best OPS on a poor-hitting team. He hit a solo homer against Weiliang Li in the Netherlands' win over China and got their lone hit in a loss to Stephen Strasburg and United States national baseball team.

They finished fifth and sixth, respectively in his two previous Olympics. Adriana is now also participating in the 2009 World Baseball Classic representing the Netherlands.

Adriana's seventh-inning single off Team USA starter Stephen Strasburg was the sole hit allowed by Strasburg in his start against the Dutch at the 2008 Olympics.

References

External links

1970 births
Living people
Acereros de Monclova players
Baseball players at the 2000 Summer Olympics
Baseball players at the 2004 Summer Olympics
Baseball players at the 2008 Summer Olympics
Cafeteros de Córdoba players
Curaçao baseball players
Curaçao expatriate baseball players in Canada
Curaçao expatriate baseball players in Mexico
Curaçao expatriate baseball players in the United States
Dunedin Blue Jays players
Dutch people of Curaçao descent
Knoxville Smokies players
Leones de Yucatán players
Mexican League baseball first basemen
Mexican League baseball second basemen
Mexican League baseball third basemen
Olympic baseball players of the Netherlands
Dutch baseball players
People from Willemstad
Piratas de Campeche players
St. Catharines Blue Jays players
Tuneros de San Luis Potosí players
2006 World Baseball Classic players
2009 World Baseball Classic players